Puerto Rican singer Pedro Capó has released four studio albums and nineteen singles. In 2018, he gained worldwide popularity after the release of his single "Calma", which was remixed multiple times to include Farruko, Alicia Keys and Alan Walker.

Albums

Studio albums

Singles

As lead artist

As a featured artist

Promotional singles

Other charted songs

Other appearances

Notes

References

Discographies of Puerto Rican artists
Capó, Pedro
Capó, Pedro